Aran Embleton also called "Azza" by her teammates (born 7 October 1981) is an English footballer. She signed for North Shields Ladies in February 2011, having previously played in midfield or attack for Sunderland Women and Doncaster Belles. Aran is a fast and very skilful midfielder/forward who has the ability to change a game. She had many offers for scholarships in America but turned them all down to play for her home team.

Club career

After starting her career with Cowgate Kestrels now known as Sunderland, Embleton joined Doncaster Belles in 1999–00. That season she set up the winning goal in Doncaster's FA Women's Cup semi–final win over Arsenal, and also started the final defeat to Croydon. In October 2000 Embleton scored twice against her former club, as The Belles beat Sunderland 4–0.

In December 2001 Embleton returned to Sunderland, but moved on to Chester-le-Street Ladies a year later. After taking a break from football, Embleton joined newly–formed club Whitley Bay in 2005 and scored 46 goals in 2005–06, before reportedly being approached by Sunderland again in August 2006.

She transferred to North Shields Ladies in February 2011, having featured for Cramlington Juniors in the intervening period.

International career
Aran Embleton played for Englandher first national call up was at the age of 14 for a training week with the senior women at bisham abbey then went onto U–18s before being called into the senior squad for the annual La Manga Club training camp in January 2001. She made her debut as a substitute in a 4–2 friendly win over Spain at Kenilworth Road in March 2001. In doing so she reportedly became the first woman from the North East to represent England.

Although not selected for UEFA Women's Euro 2001, Embleton remained in contention and played in the next friendly, a 3–0 loss to Denmark in Northampton. She made another appearance in a World Cup qualifier in Portugal in November 2001. She was called up to a 30-strong training party in La Manga in January 2002.

References

External links
Aran Embleton at FIFA

English women's footballers
Sunderland A.F.C. Ladies players
Doncaster Rovers Belles L.F.C. players
England women's international footballers
FA Women's National League players
1981 births
Living people
Women's association football midfielders
Women's association football forwards